Phumzile Majaja (born 29 November 1990) is a South African cricketer. He made his first-class debut for Border in the 2016–17 Sunfoil 3-Day Cup on 10 November 2016. He made his List A debut for Border in the 2016–17 CSA Provincial One-Day Challenge on 18 December 2016.

References

External links
 

1990 births
Living people
South African cricketers
Border cricketers
Place of birth missing (living people)